Andre Nathan Jermaine Everton Clarke (born 11 September 1988 in Hammersmith) is an English former footballer.

Clarke finished joint top scorer for Blackburn's academy in the 2005/06 season, his first full season with the club.

Clarke was loaned to Accrington Stanley on 28 July 2008, until the end of December 2008. On 28 December 2008 he scored a hat-trick at home to Grimsby, bringing his goal tally to 5 in a total of 16 league and cup appearances for Accrington.

On 2 February 2009, Clarke joined Rotherham United on a free transfer until the end of the 2008–09 season. He made his debut on 14 February 2009 against Gillingham, and scored the first goal in a 2–0 win.

At the end of the 2008–2009 season, Clarke was told he was not to be offered a new deal at Rotherham United and so became a free agent.

On 3 June 2009, it was confirmed that the striker had agreed terms with Lincoln City manager Peter Jackson. The contract was due to begin on 1 July 2009. Clarke was the Imps' second signing of the summer. However, Clarke left Lincoln City by mutual consent on 29 January 2010 after scoring just one league goal in 20 appearances.

Personal life
In January 2018, Clarke was jailed for 15 years after being found guilty of affray, kidnapping, causing grievous bodily harm with intent and two counts of false imprisonment.

References

External links

1988 births
Living people
English footballers
Association football forwards
Blackburn Rovers F.C. players
Accrington Stanley F.C. players
Rotherham United F.C. players
Lincoln City F.C. players
English Football League players
Footballers from Hammersmith